Francisco Gil (born 3 May 2000) is an Argentine professional footballer who plays as a forward for Brown.

Career
Gil's senior career began with Brown. He was promoted into the Primera B Nacional club's first-team during the 2016–17 campaign, appearing as an unused substitute in matches with All Boys, Atlético Paraná and Guillermo Brown. Gil was named as a substitute against Ferro Carril Oeste on 8 July 2017, subsequently coming on for Brian Gómez after eighty-two minutes for his professional debut at the age of seventeen. In July 2019, Gil was loaned to Primera C Metropolitana side Dock Sud. He made four appearances for them.

Career statistics
.

References

External links

2000 births
Living people
Place of birth missing (living people)
Argentine footballers
Association football forwards
Primera Nacional players
Primera C Metropolitana players
Club Atlético Brown footballers
Sportivo Dock Sud players